Angostura is a city and it is seat of its surrounding municipality in the Mexican state of Sinaloa. 

The city of Angostura reported 5,086 inhabitants in the 2010 census.

External links
https://web.archive.org/web/20040503214012/http://www.sinaloa.gob.mx/conociendo/municipios/angostura.htm

Populated places in Sinaloa